Gogos is a surname. Notable people with the surname include:

Angelica Gogos (born 1989), Australian rules footballer
Basil Gogos (1929–2017), American illustrator
Dimitri Gogos (1931–2019), Greek-Australian journalist and editor
Dimitris Gogos (1903–1985), Greek singer and composer